The Grand Portage–Pigeon River Border Crossing connects the cities of Grand Portage, Minnesota and Neebing, Ontario.  It is the main route between the larger cities of Duluth, MN and Thunder Bay, ON.

History 
The Port of Entry was established in 1964 when the International Bridge spanning the Pigeon River was completed.  Prior to 1964, the crossing was located several miles to the west at the Outlaw Bridge via Old Border Road. Ryden's Border Store, which had been located at the old crossing since 1947, moved to Grand Portage when the new bridge was completed.

At the old crossing, small towns grew around the border crossing. The Minnesota town was known as Sextus City, and the Ontario town was called Pigeon River.  Hotels, gas stations and other businesses developed around the crossing.  Today the remnants make up ghost towns on both sides of the border

Plans to move the crossing to a new bridge with a more direct route between Duluth and Port Arthur (Now Thunder Bay) began as early as 1935, but efforts of the Minnesota government to acquire the necessary land for the roadway from the US government, which held it on behalf of the Chippewa tribe, proved challenging and ended up at the US Supreme Court in 1939. Congress finally approved the condemnation request in 1943, but it was another 20 years before the bridge was prioritized, funded and completed.  It would take another four years to complete the roadway leading to it.

Both the US and Canada border stations are open 24 hours per day. The time zone changes at this crossing.  Eastern Time Zone on the Canadian side and Central time zone on the American side of the border.

See also
 List of Canada–United States border crossings

References 

Canada–United States border crossings
Rainy River District